Quicksilver Software may refer to:

Quicksilver Software, Inc. - Irvine, CA based developer of computer and video games and other software
Quicksilver (software) - Utility software program for Mac OS X